Eriogonum rixfordii is an uncommon species of wild buckwheat known by the common name pagoda buckwheat. It is native to the Mojave Desert, where it grows in California's Death Valley and adjacent parts of Nevada.

Description
This is an annual herb growing up to 40 centimeters tall. It is shaped like a pagoda, with a narrow base of stems spreading out into a wider inflorescence, which is a multilayered array of slender branches. The branches are lined with tiny bell-shaped clusters of minute white to reddish flowers.

One threat to the survival of the interesting-looking plant is collectors who pick it and take it home.

References

External links
Jepson Manual Treatment - Eriogonum rixfordii
Eriogonum rixfordii - Photo gallery

rixfordii
Flora of Nevada
Flora of the California desert regions
Death Valley
Natural history of the Mojave Desert